Bangladesh U-23 national football team is a youth football team operated under the Bangladesh Football Federation (BFF). The team would represent Bangladesh in the Summer Olympics, AFC U-22 Asian Cup, and the Asian Games.

Current squad
The following 23 players have been called up to the squad for 2022 AFC U-23 Asian Cup qualification
Caps and goals updated as of 8 December 2019 after the match against Nepal.

|-
! colspan="9"  style="background:#b0d3fb; text-align:left;"|
|- style="background:#dfedfd;"

|-
! colspan="9"  style="background:#b0d3fb; text-align:left;"|
|- style="background:#dfedfd;"

|-
! colspan="9"  style="background:#b0d3fb; text-align:left;"|
|- style="background:#dfedfd;"

Coaching staff

Maruful era

2022 AFC U-23 Asian Cup qualification

Jamie Day era

2019 South Asian Games

2020 AFC U-23 Championship qualification

2018 Asian Games

Recent results and fixtures

The following is a list of match results in the last 12 months, as well as any future matches that have been scheduled.

Competition records

Summer Olympic Games

Asian Games

AFC U-23 Asian Cup

AFC U-23 Asian Cup qualification

South Asian Games

Islamic Solidarity Games

Opponents

The team's head-to-head records against all 27 nations (all of them from AFC) whom they have played to date, including friendly internationals.

Last Updated on 28 October 2021.

Honours

 South Asian Games
 Gold medal (1):  2010

See also
 Bangladesh Football Federation
 Bangladesh national football team

References

under-23
Youth football in Bangladesh
Asian national under-23 association football teams